Bye Bye Blondie is a 2012 French comedy film directed by Virginie Despentes.

Cast

Emmanuelle Béart as Frances
Clara Ponsot as Young Frances
Béatrice Dalle as Gloria
Soko as Young Gloria
Pascal Greggory as Claude
Stomy Bugsy as Frances's driver
 as Véro
Jean-Marc Royon as Michel
Olivia Csiky Trnka as Hélène
Mata Gabin as The maid
Nina Roberts as The coach
Camille Chamoux as Tonina
Alban Lenoir as Cop

Reception
Boyd van Hoeij of Variety called Bye Bye Blondie "punk and pouty" adding that "[the film] casts luscious-lipped Gallic sexpots Beatrice Dalle and Emmanuelle Beart as middle-aged lovers who can't seem to live with or without each other".

Simon Foster of SBS wrote "Lesbian love affair a little light on depth".

References

External links

2012 comedy films
French LGBT-related films
French comedy films
2010s French-language films
2010s French films